Nikita Ruslanovich Khodorchenko (born 19 June 2000) is a Russian and Ukrainian football player. He plays for Zvezda St. Petersburg.

Club career
He made his debut in the Russian Football National League for FC Spartak-2 Moscow on 17 October 2020 in a game against FC Orenburg.

References

External links
 Profile by Russian Football National League
 

2000 births
Footballers from Donetsk
Living people
Ukrainian footballers
Russian footballers
Association football defenders
FC Zirka Kropyvnytskyi players
FC Rukh Lviv players
FC Spartak-2 Moscow players
Ukrainian First League players
Russian First League players